Tormod Ernst Dittmar Førland (6 June 1920 – 10 November 1995) was a Norwegian chemist, a researcher in inorganic and physical chemistry, and professor at the Norwegian Institute of Technology.

Personal life
Førland was born in Høyland on 6 June 1920, a son of chemical engineer Tormod Reinert Førland and Berta Josefine Dittmar. In 1943 he married , a daughter of Didrik Arup Seip.

Career
Førland graduated as chemical engineer from the Norwegian Institute of Technology in 1946, and as dr. techn. in 1958. From 1947 to 1950 he attended universities in the United States, first the Carnegie Institute of Technology and then Pennsylvania State University. He was appointed as docent at the Norwegian Institute of Technology from 1959, and as professor of physical chemistry from 1963.

His research interests included oxygen ion activity, electrochemistry and irreversible thermodynamics. He was awarded the Gunnerus Medal in 1991.

Selected works
 (thesis)

References

1920 births
1995 deaths
People from Sandnes
Norwegian chemists
Norwegian Institute of Technology alumni
Academic staff of the Norwegian Institute of Technology
Members of the Norwegian Academy of Science and Letters
Norwegian expatriates in the United States